Kabyasovo (Käbäs) is a rural locality (a village) in Kulguninsky Selsoviet, Ishimbaysky District, Bashkortostan, Russia. The population was 38 as of 2010. There is 1 street.

Geography 
Kabyasovo is located 97 km east of Ishimbay (the district's administrative centre) by road. Yaltaran is the nearest rural locality.

References 

Rural localities in Ishimbaysky District